Nitya Mehra is an Indian film director and screenwriter based in Mumbai. She is best known for Life of Pi, the Oscar winning film and Mira Nair's The Namesake and Baar Baar Dekho.

Early life
Mehra was born in Amritsar into a Punjabi family. Her mother was a fashion designer. She studied at Welham Girls' School, which is a girls boarding school in Dehradun. After completing her schooling she went on to do Literature from Delhi University, post which she did a continuing studies program in Film Production and Direction at New York University.

Career
Nitya started out her career with being a PA on a film in New York called 3 am. Eager to return to India she began assisting film makers in India and learning the ropes. As an assistant director she worked for the movies like Lakshya, The Namesake, Don, Little Zizou, The Reluctant Fundamentalist and Life of Pi. She worked as an Assistant Director for many years on various Indian and international films.

Nitya's first big directorial project was on the Indian franchise of the hit TV show 24 (Indian TV series) season1, which aired on Colors TV at the time.

In 2016, Nitya directed her first feature film Baar Baar Dekho starring Sidharth Malhotra and Katrina Kaif, co-produced by Excel Entertainment and Dharma Productions.

In 2019, she showran, executive produced and directed a web series Made in Heaven aired on Amazon Prime Video, starring Arjun Mathur, Sobhita Dhulipala and Kalki Koechlin.

She is one of the directors and writers of a film, Chand Mubarak which is part of an Indian Hindi-language anthology  Unpaused, released on Amazon Prime Video in 2020. She got critical acclaim for this film.

Nitya's upcoming projects that include "Made in Heaven Season2" is set to release in 2021.

Filmography

Films

Television

Awards and nominations
MIH nominated for Critics Choice Awards 2019

Personal life
Nitya Mehra is married with Karan D. Kapadia and they have a son.

References

External links
 

Living people
Hindi-language film directors
Indian women film directors
Indian women screenwriters
Indian women television directors
Indian television directors
English-language film directors
Artists from Amritsar
Film directors from Punjab, India
21st-century Indian film directors
Screenwriters from Punjab, India
Women artists from Punjab, India
Welham Girls' School alumni
1980 births